Events in the year 2021 in Denmark.

Incumbents
 Monarch – Margrethe II
 Prime Minister – Mette Frederiksen

Events

January 

5 January 2021 – Following a press conference by Prime Minister Mette Frederiksen, the restrictions due to coronavirus are tightened.
6 January – The Danish Meteorological Institute (DMI) releases its annual report for the year 2020. It makes national headlines after it is revealed that there were no days in which the temperature remained under 0 degrees Celsius for the entire day for the first time since records began.

April
 13 April – The Danish state strips the renewal of temporary residency permits to about 189 Syrian refugees, claiming that it is "now safe to return to Syria."
 15 April  Mads Nissen wins the 2021 World Press Photo of the Year Award.

Sports

Badminton
 1924October 2021 Denmark Open takes place in Odense.
 Viktor Axelsen wins gold in men's single
 1219 December  Denmark wins two bronze medals at the 2021 BWF World Championships.

Cycling
 23 February  Jonas Vingegaard wins Stage 5 of UAE Tour.
 28 February  Mads Pedersen wins Kuurne–Brussels–Kuurne.
 14 March  Magnus Cort wins Stage 8 of  Paris–Nice.
 15 March  Mads Würtz Schmidt wins Stage 6 of Tirreno–Adriatico.
 22 March  Andreas Kron wins Stage1 of Volta a Catalunya.
 26 March  Kasper Asgreen wins 2021 E3 Saxo Bank Classic.
 27 March  Jonas Vingegaard wins 2021 Settimana Internazionale di Coppi e Bartali and Mikkel Frølich Honoré finishes second in the same race.
 4 April  Kasper Asgreen wins Tour of Flanders.
 15 September  Michael Valgren wins Giro di Toscana.
 24 October  Lasse Norman Hansen and Michael Mørkøv win the gold in Men's omnium at the 2021 UCI Track Cycling World Championships.

Other
 1619 September  Denmark wins one gold medal, one silver medal and three bronze medals at the 2021 ICF Canoe Sprint World Championships.

Deaths
 19 April  Birgitte Reimer, film actress (born 1926)
 30 April  Flemming Hansen, politician (born 1939)
 4 May  Kirsten Stallknecht, president of the International Council of Nurses (born 1937)
 10 May  Johannes Møllehave, priest and writer (born 1937)
 27 May  Poul Schlüter, politician and former prime minister (born 1929)
 15 June  Lily Weiding, actor (born 1924)
 20 July – Vita Andersen, poet, novelist, playwright and children's writer (born 1942).
 11 November  Per Aage Brandt, writer, poet, linguist and musician (born 1944)

References

 
Years of the 21st century in Denmark
Denmark
Denmark
2020s in Denmark